Strictly Business is a full-length collaboration album released by Haystak & JellyRoll on December 3, 2011. The collaboration album peaked at 67 on the Billboard R&B/Hip-Hop Albums chart and 16 on the Heatseekers Albums chart.

Track listing
 "I'm Tryin'" - 3:49
 "Where Was You?" - 3:44
 "That's All I Know" - 4:21
 "Far Away" - 3:56
 "Squad Up" - 3:19
 "Nothing Free" - 3:22
 "Back of That Cadillac" - 2:54
 "1, 2, 3, 4" - 2:38
 "Time Gon Come" - 2:50
 "Clear My Mind" - 4:26
 "Sex Appeal" - 3:32
 "We on It" - 4:07
 "Put My City On" - 4:11
 "We Dem White Boys" - 3:58
 "Pass That" - 3:47
 "Leavin' You For Dead" - 4:55
 "Ohhh Lord" - 3:51
 "Hustlin' featuring Big Snap" - 3:34
 "Feelin' Myself" - 4:17
 "Don't Add Nothing" - 4:56
 "Gettin' Money" (Bonus Track) - 4:15

References

External links
https://itunes.apple.com/us/album/ohhh-lord/id472824968?i=472825077
https://www.amazon.com/Strictly-Business-Haystak-Jellyroll/dp/B005O64VY6
http://www.bestbuy.com/site/Strictly-Business---CD/3724796.p?id=2288767&skuId=3724796

Haystak albums
2011 albums
Jelly Roll (singer) albums